Uttarpara Government High School also known as Uttarpara Rastriya Uchcha Vidyalaya (উত্তরপাড়া রাষ্ট্রীয় উচ্চ বিদ্যালয়) is a school situated in Uttarpara, a town near Serampore City in Hooghly District, West Bengal, India. It was established on the western bank of river Hooghly by Babu Jay Krishna Mukhopadhyay and Babu Raj Krishna Mukhopadhyay on 16 May 1846. The school is directly under the Government of West Bengal.

Alumni
Biman Bagchi, Theoretical Chemist  at Indian Institute of Science.
Abhas Mitra, Theoretical Astrophysicist, Bhabha Atomic Research Center. 
Kinshuk Dasgupta, Material Scientist, Bhabha Atomic Research Centre.
 Arindam Khan , Theoretical Computer Scientist, Indian Institute of Science.
 Sujoy Parui, former cricketer.

References

High schools and secondary schools in West Bengal
Schools in Hooghly district
Educational institutions established in 1846
1846 establishments in British India